The enzyme protein-glutamate methylesterase (EC 3.1.1.61) catalyzes the reaction 

protein L-glutamate O 5-methyl ester + H2O  protein L-glutamate + methanol

This enzyme is a demethylase, and more specifically it belongs to the family of hydrolases, specifically those acting on carboxylic ester bonds.  The systematic name is protein-Lglutamate-O 5-methyl-ester acylhydrolase. Other names in common use include chemotaxis-specific methylesterase, methyl-accepting chemotaxis protein methyl-esterase, CheB methylesterase, methylesterase CheB, protein methyl-esterase, protein carboxyl methylesterase, PME, protein methylesterase, and protein-L-glutamate-5-O-methyl-ester acylhydrolase.  This enzyme participates in 3 metabolic pathways: two-component system - general, bacterial chemotaxis - general, and bacterial chemotaxis - organism-specific.

CheB is part of a two-component signal transduction system. These systems enable bacteria to sense, respond, and adapt to a wide range of environments, stressors, and growth conditions. Two-component systems are composed of a sensor histidine kinase (HK) and its cognate response regulator (RR). The HK catalyses its own autophosphorylation followed by the transfer of the phosphoryl group to the receiver domain on RR; phosphorylation of the RR usually activates an attached output domain, in this case a methyltransferase domain.

CheB is involved in chemotaxis. CheB methylesterase is responsible for removing the methyl group from the gamma-glutamyl methyl ester residues in the methyl-accepting chemotaxis proteins (MCP). CheB is regulated through phosphorylation by CheA. The N-terminal region of the protein is similar to that of other regulatory components of sensory transduction systems.

Structural studies

References

Further reading

 

Protein domains
EC 3.1.1
Enzymes of known structure